The vice president of Transnistria was a political position in that unrecognized state. The vice president was the deputy head of state. The position was abolished in 2011. 

Politics of Transnistria
Politics of Moldova
Transnistria